Plympton is a community in the Canadian province of Nova Scotia, located in the District of Clare in Digby County. It is home to Savary Provincial Park. Notable residents include Alfred William Savary, an early parliamentarian and local historian.

The community was named after Plympton, Massachusetts.

References

Communities in Digby County, Nova Scotia
General Service Areas in Nova Scotia